Turning Up may refer to:

 "Turning Up" (Arashi song), released in 2019
 "Turning Up" (James Reid song), released in 2017